Elisabeth Raiser (née Bertha Elisabeth Freiin von Weizsäcker) is a 21st-century historian, former President of the German Evangelical Church Assembly, and daughter of Carl Friedrich von Weizsäcker.

Life and career
Born as Bertha Elisabeth Freiin von Weizsäcker in Zurich, Switzerland on August 18, 1940, Elisabeth Raiser is the daughter of polymath Carl Friedrich von Weizsäcker and niece of Richard von Weizsäcker, former president of the Federal Republic of Germany.

Her husband is Reverend Dr. Konrad Raiser.

She studied history and Romance languages and, like her mother before her, earned her doctorate in history. In addition, she has been active with various ecumenical activities throughout her life, and served as the president of the first German Evangelical Church Assembly.

In June 2018, she and her husband spoke at the Pfarrhaustreff in Diedersdorf and introduced a short version of Kreisgang, the film she directed regarding her father's life and work as a philosopher, physicist and peace activist. The film explores the spiritual experiences which helped shape her father throughout his life, according to Potsdam's Märkische Allgemeine, including the "divine grace [which] prevented him and his colleagues from having to build the atomic bomb for Hitler" during the period he worked with Werner Heisenberg and Otto Hahn on Germany's uranium project.

References

External links 
 Evangelische Kirche in Deutschland site

Weizsäcker family
German Protestants
1940 births
Living people
German expatriates in Switzerland